The "Carnival of Venice" is based on a Neapolitan folk tune called "O Mamma, Mamma Cara" and popularized by violinist and composer Niccolo Paganini, who wrote twenty variations on the original tune. He titled it "Il Carnevale Di Venezia," Op. 10. In 1829, he wrote to a friend, "The variations I've composed on the graceful Neapolitan ditty, 'O Mamma, Mamma Cara,' outshine everything. I can't describe it."

Since then, the tune has been used for a number of popular songs, such as "If You Should Go to Venice" and "My Hat, It Has Three Corners" (or in German).

A series of theme and variations has been written for solo cornet, as "show off" pieces that contain virtuoso displays of double and triple tonguing, and fast tempos.

Since Paganini, many variations on the theme have been written, most notably those by Jean-Baptiste Arban, Del Staigers, Herbert L. Clarke for the cornet, trumpet, and euphonium, Francisco Tárrega and Johann Kaspar Mertz for classical guitar, Ignace Gibsone and Louis Moreau Gottschalk for piano, and Giovanni Bottesini for double bass. Chopin's "Souvenir de Paganini", dedicated to the composer and violin virtuoso Niccolò Paganini, is another variation on this theme. The popular novelty song, "(How Much Is) That Doggie in the Window?", written and recorded in 1952, is based on the tune.

The piece has also been arranged for tuba, notably played by John Fletcher and available on the CD The Best of Fletch. Also Roger Bobo on Tuba Libera (cd). Other tubists whose performances of the piece are noteworthy include Øystein Baadsvik, and Patrick Sheridan.

Dick Manning and Buddy Kaye wrote a popular song based on "Carnival of Venice," named "A Carnival in Venice," recorded by The Mills Brothers in 1954.

Between 2015 and 2018, German crossover violinist David Garrett gained wide recognition with the tune, playing variations of Paganini's variations in movies and with various orchestras and bands.

Arrangements
Jean-Baptiste Arban (1825-1889): Variations on 'Carnival of Venice' (for trumpet or cornet)
Nicolas-Charles Bochsa Le Carnaval de Venise for pedal harp
Giovanni Bottesini Introduction and Variations on Carnival of Venice (Double Bass)
Giulio Briccialdi Carnival of Venice for flute and orchestra Op.77
Ernesto Cavallini Carnival of Venice (Eb Clarinet or any Eb instrument like Eb Piccolo Violin)
Charles Dancla The Carnival of Venice (for violin)
Heinrich Wilhelm Ernst (1812–1865) Le carnaval de Venise (for Violin)
Félix Godefroid Carnaval de Venise pour harpe
Elgar Howarth: The Carnival of Venice Variations (for Brass Ensemble)
Adrien-François Servais: Fantaisie Burlesque sur le Carnaval de Venise, op. 9 (for cello)
Paul Jeanjean (1874-1928): Venice Carnival (for clarinet)
Bob McChesney Variations on 'Carnival of Venice' for Trombone
Carlo Munier for mandolin and guitar
Paganini: Il carnevale di Venezia (for violin: Scordatura comes in: Tune the Violin up a Half Step)
Francisco Tárrega (1852-1909): Variations on Carnival of Venice (for guitar)
Eduardo Zerega Le Carnival de Venise pour mandoline et piano
Franz Liszt Variations sur Le Carnaval de Venise (for piano)
Frederick Hemke The Carnival Of Venice (Introduction and Variations: opus posthumous) (for Eb alto saxophone)
Paul Génin Carnaval de Venise (Opus 14, fantasia and variations for flute and orchestra)

Recorded versions
"(The) Carnival of Venice", Arban, arr. James. Harry James and His Orchestra (Columbia 36004) 1941
"Carnival of Venice", arr. Paganini, Zino Francescatti (Violin), Arthur Balsam (Piano) 1954
"Carnival of Venice", Hank Snow guitar solo 1956
"Carnival of Venice", arr. Frosini, Danny Kaye	1960
"Carnival of Venice", arr. Tony Mottola, Tony Mottola And His Orchestra 1962
"Carnival of Venice", arr. Jean Rolle, The Waikikis Netherlands	1963
"Carnival of Venice", arr. Al Hirt, Al Hirt from Live at Carnegie Hall (Al Hirt album) 1965
"Carnival of Venice", arr. Tony Osborne,  Tony Osborne's Three Brass Buttons 1968
"Carnival of Venice, Goodnight Vienna"	The Keith Newton Sound 1970
"The Carnival of Venice Variations", arr. Elgar Howarth, Philip Jones Brass Ensemble 1975
"Carnival of Venice", arr. Del Staigers, The Canadian Brass from The Village Band 1981
"Variations Sur "Le Carnaval De Venise"", arr. Donald Hunsberger, from "Carnaval", Wynton Marsalis and Eastman Wind Ensemble, 1987 (CBS Masterworks MK 42137)
"Carnival of Venice", arr. Johnny Lo Piccolo for accordion Australia
"Carnaval de Venise", Victor Massé La Reine Topaze Sumi Jo and English Chamber Orchestra 1994

Film/TV appearances
1955 The Honeymooners – In the episode, Young Man with a Horn (#1.26), Alice finds Ralph's old cornet in the bedroom closet. Ralph remembers lost career chances, and feels discouraged. The song Ralph attempts to play on the cornet is "Carnival of Venice".
1992 Arizona Dream - It plays during the cadillac dream sequence Axel has while driving to Arizona with Paul.
2013 ''The Devil's Violinist

Notes

Compositions for trumpet